
GoldVish S.A. is a Swiss manufacturer of premium luxury mobile phones. The company is specialized in combining high-end technology and Swiss craftsmanship.

In 2006, GoldVish's "Le Million", a solid gold, diamond-studded "Piece Unique" is listed in the Guinness Book of World Records as "The world's most exclusive and expensive cellular phone ever sold" at €1 million and a guaranteed limited production of three pieces.

See also
Gresso
Vertu
Moscow Millionaire Fair

References

External links
 

Luxury brands
Mobile phone manufacturers
Manufacturing companies based in Geneva
Swiss brands